Gooseneck may refer to:

Biology
 The neck of a goose
 Gooseneck barnacle, a species of crustacean
 A flower of the variety Lysimachia clethroides

Geography
 Gooseneck, Isle of Man, a hairpin corner on the Snaefell Mountain Course
 A type of erosional feature, in which a meander of an entrenched river gets entrenched into surrounding bedrock, as in Goosenecks State Park

Mechanical
 Gooseneck (sailing), a type of sailing rigging attachment
 Gooseneck (drilling rig), a thick, hollow metal elbow that supports and provides a downward angle from which the Kelly hose hangs
 Gooseneck (piping), a piping or ductwork feature
 A crowbar (tool)
A gooseneck flask (or swan neck flask) is a flask used in biology that has a curved neck to trap particulate
 A gooseneck trailer hitch, for commercial and agricultural use
 Gooseneck (fixture), a type of flexible tubing used in gooseneck lamps or microphone stands
 A kind of a chopper motorcycle frame, which has the front part of frame (between the fuel tank and the fork) stretched

See also
 William Madison McDonald (1866–1950), American politician, businessman and banker nicknamed "Gooseneck Bill"